The 2015 FIM CEV Moto2 European Championship was the sixth CEV Moto2 season and the first under the FIM banner. The season was held over 11 races at 7 meetings, began on 26 April at Algarve and finished on 15 November at Valencia.

Calendar

Entry list

Championship standings

See also
 2015 FIM CEV Moto3 Junior World Championship

References

External links
 

FIM CEV Moto2 European Championship
CEV Moto2
CEV Moto2